The 1953 Brown Bears football team was an American football team that represented Brown University as an independent during the 1953 college football season. In their third season under head coach Alva Kelley, the Bears compiled a 3–5–1 record, but outscored their opponents 134 to 127. G.E.  Haverty was the team captain. Brown played its home games at Brown Stadium in Providence, Rhode Island.

Schedule

References

Brown
Brown Bears football seasons
Brown Bears football